Dorrien is a surname. Notable people with the surname include:

Carlos Dorrien (born 1948), American sculptor 
Catharina Helena Dörrien (1717–1795), German botanist
Gary Dorrien (born 1952), American ethicist and theologian
George Dorrien,  Governor of the Bank of England 1818–1820
Magens Dorrien Magens (1768–1849), English banker, politician, and author

See also
 Dorrien Gardens
 Dorian (disambiguation)